Rechov Sumsum (Hebrew: רחוב סומסום, literally: Sesame Street) is the Israeli adaptation of the U.S. children's show of the same name.

The first three series of the show were a joint production of the Israeli Educational Television and the Sesame Workshop, a Worldwide American non-profit organization which has been co-producing the original American Sesame Street since 1969.

The story line and casts of Rechov Sumsum are tailored to an Israeli audience.

History
The idea for Sesame Street being aired in Israel goes all the way back to 1971, where black and white episodes of the show broadcast in English were briefly shown on Israeli television. But the Israeli Ministry of Education thought it was entertaining, but not educational enough for Children, so it was eventually taken off air.
 
Rechov Sumsum consists of four television series and one short lived spin-off: Rechov Sumsum, Shalom Sesame, Rechov Sumsum/Shara'a Simsim, Sippuray Sumsum and Rechov Sumsum (2006) , Shalom Sesame (2009) .

Rechov Sumsum (1983–1986) 
This original Israeli version of the series was the most popular. 195 episodes were produced and broadcast between 1983 and 1986 on the educational television channel. Puppet segments were taken from the American series and dubbed in Hebrew (the same has been done in all other Israeli versions of the series). All other aspects of the production were local: The program took place in an Israeli neighborhood in which children and adults played together. Original connecting segments were added in which Israeli children shared a view of their lives. The series had a parallel character to Big Bird – a big porcupine, by the name of "Kippi" and a parallel character to Oscar the grouch, by the name of "Moishe Oofnik". Oofnik was a punk and used to complain a lot and bother the neighborhood's residents, but even so, he soon became friends with the children in the neighborhood. The residents who lived in the street included Avner and Hanna, who were the owners of the coffee house near Kipi's apartment. After they moved to a different city they were replaced by a new coffee shop named Gabi. Opposite to the coffee house lived Miki and Nathan. Nathan lived in front of an older resident named Yona (Yona Atari). In front of Yona's apartment was Shmil's (Shmuel Shilo) electricity appliance repairing shop, where Miki worked as Shmil's assistant.

Occasionally Albert used to come over to the neighborhood for visits – a peculiar character with a French accent with whom Kipi used to consult on different issues.

The series was broadcast repeatedly many times until 1996. Then, these broadcasts were suspended due to expiry of the co-production agreement between the Israeli Educational Television and the Sesame Workshop – the rights owner of the original American Sesame Street. The right to show the Hebrew-dubbed segments of the original American show produced by the Sesame Workshop were transferred to the private cable channel "HOP! Channel".

Following the success of the series many products were marketed to the Israeli public based on the series, including: records of the songs and the sketches from the show, dolls of Kipi Ben Kipod, school supplies, clothing and beddings. A new fashion which started due to the show was the "Kipi shoes" – Plaided slippers in shades of brown and black, which although existed prior to the show, became much more popular following the show.

The curriculum goals of the show were: Mutual Respect (human diversity, mutual respect); The Child's World (body parts, child's powers, health, reasoning, problem solving); Reading, Mathematics, and Writing (prereading and writing, numbers, geometric forms); and Cognitive Organization (perceptual discrimination, relational concepts, classifying).  Although messages about mutual respect were always included in the curriculum of the original US show, it was the first time this area was a major focus of any version of Sesame Street.  It was a priority because of the "profound political tension in the region". This production has been viewed as a model for the use of television to convey antisectarian messages.

Shalom Sesame (1989–1991) 
The program Shalom Sesame was an Israeli–American co-production which combined American actors, such as Sarah Jessica Parker, Bonnie Franklin, Anne Meara, and Jerry Stiller, and the original Israeli cast members which participated in the original Rechov Sumsum series. In addition, the renowned violinist Yitzhak Perlman participated regularly on the series.

The series was produced in 1989 (its first season), in 1990 (its second season), and 1991 (its third season), and was broadcast in Israel between the years 1989 and 1990.

The series was first intended for broadcast in the US and was therefore recorded completely in English. Only later it was dubbed in Hebrew for Israeli viewers (although the Shalom Sesame logo still showed up at the beginning). Following the big wave of immigration from Russia to Israel in those years, the series was also dubbed in Russian. In 2006 the series came out in the United States in a DVD bundle which included all episodes of the series (without the Hebrew dubbing).

Rechov Sumsum/Shara'a Simsim (1998–2000) 
This combined production included both Israeli-Jews and Israeli-Arabs in order to generate a message of coexistence. Al-Quds University's Institute of Modern Media co-produced the series. The series premiered on April 1 1998. 

The production included 50 episodes and featured new characters aside from Kipi and Oofnik. A new Israeli Muppet was named Dafi (a purple monster), and two Arab muppets named Hanin (an orange monster) and Kareem (a green rooster) were also introduced as a way to bring diversity into the cast. A new stage was built which included a garden, a promenade, a bookstore and an ice cream store. Moishe Oofnik's old car was "stuck" in the center of the neighborhood. Due to the disintegration of the original muppet of Kipi Ben Kipod and due to rights issues, Kipi's muppet was re-designed with a more "muppet-like" design. The American co-producers requested that Kipi would be played by an actor with a more masculine voice, so Guy Friedman was chosen to voice Kipi. 

The opening theme song was replaced with one composed by Shlomo Gronich and included a number of sentences in Arabic. 

The program received mixed criticism. When the co-production dissolved in 2002, it was split and was renamed Sippuray Sumsum (Sesame Stories) and Palestine would later receive their own version of the show.

Sippuray Sumsum (2003-2006) 
In 2003, the spin-off series Sippuray Sumsum was broadcast on the Israeli HOP! Channel and it featured two new Muppets named Noah and Brosh. The hosts of the show were Tzahi and Aibtism (Hind Ayub). This series was largely funded by the European Union, and its goal was to promote messages of respect and understanding among Israeli and Arab children in the Middle East. Nowadays, this series is occasionally broadcast on Channel 33 with Arabic dubbing.

The fourth series – Rechov Sumsum (2006–present)

Season 1 
In 2006, the show transitioned back to the Rechov Sumsum name and debuted on the HOP! Channel, mixing the Sippuray Sumsum cast, new characters, and returning favorite Moishe Oofnik from the original seasons. From December 2006 a new series called "Rechov Sumsum" was produced for the Israeli HOP! Channel. The new series featured the main Muppets from Sippuray Sumsum – Noah and Brosh, along with the hosts Tzahi (Dror Keren) and Aibtism (Hind Ayub), many other actors, and two new muppets, Avigail and Mahboub. Mahboub became a source of controversy as it was confirmed that he was a muppet of Arab origin.

There were also plans and negotiations to restore the original Muppets of Kipi Ben Kipod and Moishe Oofnik in this series, but eventually due to technical and economical considerations, only Moishe Oofnik was featured in the series.  The opening theme is the original theme song of the show which was written by Yoni Rechter and sung by a new band of children called "Sharonit".  The show also included a campaign against violence. The fourth series included 40 episodes.

Season 2 
In December 2009, a new season for Rechov Sumsum was produced for "Hop! Channel".
The new season featured the previous Muppets: Avigail, Brosh, Mahboub and Moishe Oofnik with new neighbors including Sivan, a Muppet in a wheelchair and Sesame Streets Grover, or Kruvi in Hebrew.

Season 3 
In February 2012, another new season for Rechov Sumsum was produced for "Hop! Channel".
The new season featured the previous Muppets: Avigail, Mahboub, Sivan and Moishe Oofnik with new neighbor called Sesame Street's Elmo.

Season 4 
In March 2015, another new season for Rechov Sumsum debuted on "Hop! Channel".
The new season featured the muppets: Avigail, Mahboub, Sivan and Elmo. The focus for the season is "Learn about science and curiosity." , Abigail's former Puppeteer, is going back to the show as a new human character called Ayelet, tour guide at the museum.

The fifth series – Shalom Sesame (2009–2011) 
Between 2009 and 2011, 12 new Shalom Sesame direct-to-DVD episodes were produced. This is an Israeli–American co-production which combines various American actors, such as Anneliese van der Pol, Jake Gyllenhaal, Christina Applegate, Greg Kinnear, Debra Messing and Cedric the Entertainer, and is geared at teaching Jewish-American children about the Secular Jewish culture. The series was filmed in the United States and in several places in Israel, including the Western Wall.

The sixth series - Tokhnit He'írvkh Shel Elmo (2022) 
In October 2022, Tokhnit He'írvkh Shel Elmo will debut on "Hop! Channel".
The new season featured two muppet relationships: Moishe Oofnik & Elmo.

Original Muppet characters
Rechov Sumsum (The original series) and Shalom Sesame (The second series)
 Kippi Ben Kippod (Sarai Tzuriel) – a porcupine equivalent of Big Bird on Sesame Street.
 Moishe Oofnik (Gilles Ben David) – a brown grouch, similar to Oscar the Grouch on Sesame Street, who lives in a broken car.Rechov Sumsum/Shara'a Simsim (The third series):
 Kippi Ben Kippod (Guy Friedman) – This series featured a new design of Kippi.
 Moishe Oofnik (Gilles Ben David)
 Dafi (Irit Shilo) – Haneen's best friend; a happy young purple monster.
 Haneen - a happy young orange monster, she lives on Shara'a Simsim with Karim.
 Karim - built by Paul Andrejco of Puppet Heap.Sippurei Sumsum (Spin-off):
 Noah (Gilles Ben David)
 Brosh (Avi Yakir)Rechov Sumsum'' (The fourth - sixth series):
 Moishe Oofnik (Gilles Ben David) – Moishe now lives in a green recycling bin. (seasons 1–3; The Not-Too-Late Show)
 Noah (Gilles Ben David) – a curious red monster, he is Mahboub's best friend. (season 1)
 Brosh (Avi Yakir) – an orange monster, he likes cleaning. (seasons 1–2)
 Mahboub (Yousef Sweid) – a young blue monster who speaks both Hebrew and Arabic. (seasons 1–4)
 Avigail (Shani Cohen and Guni Paz) – a young pink monster, she likes to play and is happy with everyone. (seasons 1–4)
 Sivan (Efrat Gonan) – a purple Muppet in a wheelchair. (seasons 2–4)
 Grover (Gilles Ben David and Yoav Heyman) – a blue monster from Sesame Street. (seasons 2)
 Elmo (Ariel Doron and Zvika Fohrman) – a little red monster from Sesame Street. (seasons 3–4; The Not-Too-Late Show)

Original American characters
 Cookie Monster a.k.a. "Ugifletzet" (Dov Reiser, 1983–1986 Shimon Cohen, 1989-2003 Eldad Prives 2009-2011 Giora Kenneth 2006-)
 Kermit the Frog a.k.a. "Kermit HaTzfardea" (Eyal Bertonov, 1983–1990 Yoav Tzafir, 1998-2000 Ami Mandelman 2009)
 Bert and Ernie a.k.a. "Arik and Bentz" (Benz Shlomo Bar-Aba 1983–2003 and Ami Mandelman; 2006- Arik Yosef Shiloach 1983-2003 and Zvika Fohrman 2006-)
 Grover a.k.a. "Kruvi" (Israel Gurion, 1983-1998 Gadi Levy 2000–2003 Yoav Hayman 2006-)
 Count von Count a.k.a. "Mar Sofer" (Albert Cohen, 1983–1998 Lior Halfon 2000–2003 Robert Henig 2006-)
 Herry Monster a.k.a. "Shraga" or Ezra (Gidi Gov)
 Oscar the Grouch (Avi Pnini 1983–2003 and Ido Mosseri 2006-)
 Elmo (Iris Zinger 1983–2003 and Zvika Fohrman 2006-)
 Telly Monster a.k.a. "Tali" (Itzik Saidoff 1983–2003 and Simcha Barbiro 2006-)

See also
Television in Israel

References

External links
 Rechov Sumsum – Classic Version, on Israeli Educational Television.

Sesame Street international co-productions
Israeli television shows featuring puppetry
Television series with live action and animation
Israeli children's television series
Israeli Educational Television
1983 Israeli television series debuts
1990s Israeli television series
1980s Israeli television series
2000s Israeli television series
2010s Israeli television series
Israeli television series based on American television series